Mary Steinhauser (August 25, 1942 – June 11, 1975) was a Canadian social worker and prison classification officer who was killed during a hostage-taking at the B.C. Penitentiary in 1975. On June 9, 1975, Steinhauser was one of 15 people that were taken hostage by three inmates, Andy Bruce, Dwight Lucas and Claire Wilson, who were attempting a prison breakout. Prior to the hostage-taking and her death, Steinhauser was an outspoken advocate against solitary confinement.

A bursary was opened in Steinhauser's name and benefits Simon Fraser University Aboriginal Undergraduate Students in Arts & Social Sciences.

Personal life
Steinhauser was born in Duncan, British Columbia, Canada, on August 25, 1942. Mary was the elder daughter of August Steinhauser and Johanna Reisner's two children. Mary Steinhauser's father emigrated to Canada in 1925 from Ravensburg, Germany. He began farming in Edmonton, Alberta, and subsequently moved to Lake Cowichan, BC where he worked in the sawmill. Mary Steinhauser’s mother immigrated to Canada in 1939 from Vienna, Austria. Mary's parents married in 1941.

Steinhauser grew up in Lake Cowichan until age 5, when she moved with her family to Burton, British Columbia, a small town in the West Kootenays, where her parents had purchased a farm.  Upon graduation from secondary school in Nakusp, BC, Mary began her training as a psychiatric nurse at Essondale, BC. After working at Essondale for 2 years, she moved to Toronto, Ontario and worked for one year as a nurse at the Queen Street Mental Health Hospital.  Following this, she returned to BC, taking up nursing duties at Tranquille School for the mentally handicapped in Kamloops for 2 years.

Steinhauser then began work as a psychiatric nurse for the Matsqui Institution, a newly opened medium-security prison in Matsqui, BC. From 1967 to 1970, Steinhauser studied psychology and sociology at Simon Fraser University in BC, where she graduated  in 1971 with a BA (Honours) in Psychology and Sociology.  Immediately after attaining her bachelor's degree, she began graduate studies at the University of British Columbia in social work; Mary was awarded her Master of Social Work degree in May 1973.

Hostage-taking incident
On the day in question, inmates Bruce, Lucas, and Wilson made an unsuccessful attempt to escape from prison and took 15 people hostage. Steinhauser, who was taken hostage at knifepoint, volunteered to be the principal hostage, which meant that she was held in a room outside the vault area where all the other hostages were kept. The three inmates demanded several things, including medical examinations for Lucas and Bruce, access to hot and cold water in isolation cells, and restoration of recreation yard privileges for segregated prisoners. They also demanded safe passage out of the country.

The hostage stand-off lasted for 41 hours. During this time, the inmates kept their hostages in the penitentiary's vault, with the exception of Mary. At approximately 1 A.M. on June 11, one of the hostages tried to overpower the inmates in an attempt to escape, after which point all of the hostages except Steinhauser retreated to the vault, where they locked themselves inside. Soon after, a tactical squad of prison officers attempted to rescue the hostages and fired upon the hostage-takers, fatally shooting Steinhauser, who was being held as a human shield in front of Bruce.

Police Chief Rod Keary initially informed reporters that prior to her shooting, Steinhauser had been stabbed by the inmates, per reports from the other hostages. This was proven to be erroneous by the coroner's report, which stated that Steinhauser had received two bullet wounds and also had abrasions, bruising, and recent needle marks in both forearms.

After the shooting an inquest was opened, which alleged that prison guard Albert Hollinger (who was identified by Bruce) was the officer who shot Steinhauser. The inquest also alleged that Hollinger had deliberately switched up the tactical team's guns in an attempt to keep from being identified as the shooter while claiming that he was collecting the guns in order to keep them away from prisoners.

In January 1976, Andy Bruce appeared in a New Westminster provincial court where he gave his account of the hostage-taking situation to Judge Philip Govan. Bruce said that after the prison tactical squad arrived all of the hostages except for Mary Steinhauser shut themselves inside a vault in the penitentiary. According to Bruce, the other hostages "acted out of fear; their only concern was to get that vault door shut and keep it shut." Andy Bruce went on to allege that, after being shot twice in the jaw by a prison guard he identified as Albert Hollinger, Mary Steinhauser crawled in front him, where "she screamed, 'Don't shoot him.'" After this, according to Bruce's testimony, Hollinger shot and killed Mary Steinhauser.

Government response 
In an interview on June 11, 1975, Canadian Prime Minister Pierre Elliott Trudeau commented on the hostage-taking incident.  Trudeau stated how "very sorry" he felt about Mary Steinhauser's death and he discussed the federal government's commitment to not letting the inmates escape: "To make sure these guys wouldn't get off with anything...we would hound them wherever they were."

Legal consequences
In July 1976 a jury ruled that the shooting was not intentional and that the guards, including Hollinger, were acting under the belief that Steinhauser's life was actively being threatened by the inmates. The jury further recommended that future, similar incidents be handled by outside teams that have been trained in hostage situations.

In media
The play One Tiger to a Hill by Sharon Pollock is loosely based on the incident.
The incident was fictionalized in Christian Bruyère's play Walls and its film adaptation Walls. The Steinhauer role in those works was given the name Joan Tremblay, and was played by Andrée Pelletier in the film.
In 2014 a stage performance entitled Brave: The Mary Steinhauser Legacy was held at the Terry Fox Theatre in Port Coquitlam.

References

External links
 

1942 births
1975 deaths
Canadian social workers
People from Duncan, British Columbia
University of British Columbia School of Social Work alumni
Simon Fraser University alumni